Paul-François de Galluccio, marquis de L'Hôpital (13 January 1697 - 15 October 1767) was a French nobleman and ambassador to Russia from 1757 until 1760, when he was succeeded by Louis Auguste Le Tonnelier de Breteuil.

Biography 
He was from the old Neapolitan house of Gallucci or Galluccio. He entered the French Army in 1712 and had risen to 'Mestre-de-Camp' by 1739, when he was appointed ambassador extraordinary to the Kingdom of the Two Sicilies. He remained ambassador to the Two Sicilies until 1746.

In 1746, he became lieutenant-general and inspector-general of the cavalry and the dragoons. On 20 September 1746, he organised the defence against the British Raid on Lorient.

References

1697 births
1767 deaths
Place of birth missing
Ambassadors of France to the Russian Empire